Thomas Burch may refer to:

Thomas G. Burch (1869–1951), American politician
Thomas Burch (circuit rider) (1778–1849), Methodist preacher
Tom Burch (born 1931), American politician in the state of Kentucky

See also
Thomas Birch (disambiguation)